Lesbian, gay, bisexual, and transgender (LGBT) persons in the U.S. state of Louisiana may face some legal challenges not experienced by non-LGBT residents. Same-sex sexual activity is legal in Louisiana, and same-sex marriage has been recognized in the state since June 2015 as a result of the Supreme Court's decision in Obergefell v. Hodges.

In September 2014, two courts, one federal and one state, produced contradictory rulings on the constitutionality of the state's denial of marriage rights to same-sex couples. The U.S. Supreme Court resolved that conflict when it ruled such bans unconstitutional in Obergefell v. Hodges on June 26, 2015. Two days later, Governor Bobby Jindal said the state would comply with that ruling and license same-sex marriages.

Discrimination on account of sexual orientation and gender identity is prohibited in employment as a result of Bostock v. Clayton County, but not in the areas of housing, health care, education, credit or public accommodations. A 2017 opinion poll from the Public Religion Research Institute showed that 63% of Louisiana residents supported anti-discrimination legislation protecting LGBT people.

Laws against same-sex sexual activity
There were no laws against same-sex sexual acts in Louisiana until 1805, when the Louisiana Territory enacted its first criminal code after annexation by the United States. The code contained a sodomy provision with the common-law definition and a mandatory penalty of life imprisonment at hard labor, whether heterosexual or homosexual. In 1896, the state amended its sodomy statute, reducing the penalty to 2–10 years' imprisonment but the hard labor provision remained. It also extended the law's application to fellatio (oral sex). In the 1914 case of State v. Murry, the Louisiana Supreme Court held that the law included the "act called 'fellatio,' and perhaps that other perversion called 'cunnilingus', committed with the mouth and the female sexual organ". In 1942, a comprehensive criminal code revision was passed, reducing the maximum penalty for sodomy to five years' imprisonment, adding a fine of 2,000 dollars and making the hard labor provision optional.

In one of only four court cases dealing with consensual lesbian activity in the country, in State v. Young et al. (1966), the Louisiana Supreme Court unanimously held that cunnilingus between lesbian partners was also criminal. In 1974, Louisiana adopted a constitutional provision dealing with the right to privacy, reading:

Despite the passage of the aforementioned provision, the state Supreme Court in State v. Lindsey (1975) ruled that the sodomy statute was not "unconstitutionally vague" nor a violation of privacy rights. That same year, the Louisiana State Legislature enacted a unique statute distinguishing between "homosexual rape" and "heterosexual rape", both punishable by death, though the U.S. Supreme Court struck down the death penalty for rape two years later in Coker v. Georgia. It also abolished the minimum penalty of two years' imprisonment (but kept the maximum penalty of five years), and inserted explicit language that sodomy could be committed with someone "of the same sex or opposite sex". Solicitation for sodomy, whether heterosexual or homosexual, was made a felony in 1982. In 1992, the state enacted a sex offender registration law, under which those convicted of consensual private sodomy would be registered as "sex offenders" on par with rapists and child abusers. The law required the offender to report any change of address and provide a photograph and fingerprints to the sheriff.

The sodomy law was rendered unenforceable in 2003 by the U.S. Supreme Court's decision in Lawrence v. Texas. In 2005, the United States Court of Appeals for the Fifth Circuit struck down the part of the statute that criminalized adult consensual anal and oral sex.

In 2013, law enforcement officers in East Baton Rouge Parish arrested men who had engaged in sexual activity banned by the statute. The District Attorney did not prosecute those arrested, and both he and the parish sheriff supported repealing the sodomy statute. In April 2014, a bill to repeal the statute failed in the Louisiana House of Representatives on a 66–27 vote after lobbying in opposition by the Louisiana Family Forum, thus keeping an unconstitutional law on the books.

In early May 2018, the Louisiana House of Representatives unanimously approved a bill toughening laws against bestiality and separating them from the unconstitutional sodomy law. The Senate passed the bill later that month in a 36–1 vote, and it was signed into law by Governor John Bel Edwards on May 25. Initially, ten Republican lawmakers stated their opposition to the anti-bestiality bill, which was also opposed by conservative groups, including the Louisiana Family Forum.

Recognition of same-sex relationships

The U.S. Supreme Court's ruling in Obergefell v. Hodges on June 26, 2015 held that the denial of marriage rights to same-sex couples is unconstitutional, invalidating the ban on same-sex marriage in Louisiana.

In 1988 and 1999, Louisiana added provisions to its Civil Code that prohibited same-sex couples from marrying and prohibited the recognition of same-sex marriages from other jurisdictions. Louisiana added bans on same-sex marriage and civil unions to its Constitution in 2004.

Two lawsuits challenged the state's bans. In state court in Costanza v. Caldwell, the plaintiffs won initially, but the ruling was stayed pending appeal, which was left unresolved after oral argument was heard on January 29, 2015. In federal court in Robicheaux v. Caldwell, plaintiffs challenged the state's refusal to recognize same-sex marriages from other jurisdictions. U.S. District Judge Martin Feldman ruled on September 3, 2014 for the state, writing that "Louisiana has a legitimate interest ... whether obsolete in the opinion of some, or not, in the opinion of others ... in linking children to an intact family formed by their two biological parents". On appeal to the Fifth Circuit Court of Appeals, the case remained unresolved at the time of the U.S. Supreme Court decision in Obergefell on June 26, 2015. Following the Supreme Court ruling, the Fifth Circuit Court of Appeals remanded the case back to the District Court, where Judge Feldman reversed his order, ruling in favor of the Robicheaux plaintiffs.

Adoption and parenting
On September 22, 2014, Judge Edward Rubin found Louisiana's prohibition on allowing married same-sex couples to adopt to be unconstitutional and granted the first same-sex adoption in the state in Costanza v. Caldwell. Prior to Judge Rubin's ruling, Louisiana allowed single persons to adopt and did not explicitly deny adoption or second-parent adoption to same-sex couples. In light of the U.S. Supreme Court's decision in Obergefell v. Hodges, married same-sex couples are entitled to the same rights, benefits and responsibilities as married different-sex couples, including full joint adoption and parental rights.

Louisiana has successfully defended in federal court its refusal to amend the birth certificate of a child born in Louisiana and adopted in New York by a married same-sex couple who sought to have a new certificate issued with their names as parents, as is standard practice for Louisiana-born children adopted by opposite-sex married couples. On October 11, 2011, the U.S. Supreme Court rejected a request from Lambda Legal, representing the plaintiffs in the case, Adar v. Smith, to review the case. Louisiana birth certificates still use gender-specific terms when referring to parents; however, the Obergefell decision provides equal access to all marriage-related rights for same-sex spouses, reaffirmed by the court in Pavan v. Smith in June 2017. Preventing a married same-sex couple from being listed on their child's birth certificate is unconstitutional. As of 2021, the only options for parents of a Louisiana birth certificate are "mother" and "father", with there being no options for same-sex couples, but Louisiana Vital Records will still list both same-sex parents despite this, although one of them will need to be misgendered on the child's birth certificate.

Lesbian couples have access to fertility treatments and in vitro fertilization. State law recognizes the non-genetic, non-gestational mother as a legal parent to a child born via donor insemination, but only if the parents are married.

Surrogacy is highly restricted in Louisiana. A bill passed in 2016 makes gestational surrogacy legal, but only for Louisiana residents who have both used their own gametes in the surrogacy process. Therefore, same-sex couples and single individuals, as well as heterosexual couples who need a donor gamete, cannot complete a surrogacy contract in the state. Traditional surrogacy is prohibited in all cases.

Discrimination protections

On February 17, 1992, Governor Edwin Edwards issued an executive order prohibiting discrimination in state employment on the basis of sexual orientation. In August 1996, Governor Murphy J. Foster, Jr. allowed the executive order to lapse. On December 4, 2004, Governor Kathleen Blanco reissued Edwards' executive order, but in August 2008 Governor Bobby Jindal allowed it to expire. On April 13, 2016, Governor John Bel Edwards reinstated the provision, as announced shortly after his election. However, Bel Edwards's order was struck down in November 2017 by an appellate court which found that the Governor had "overstepped his authority". In March 2018, the Louisiana Supreme Court upheld the appellate court ruling.

In May 2015, a House committee rejected a bill that would have protected people who exercise their religious beliefs on same-sex marriage. However, Governor Jindal then issued an executive order to that end. On April 13, 2016, Governor Bel Edwards rescinded that executive order.

On April 28, 2016, the Senate Labor Committee approved in a 4–3 vote a bill that would have banned employment discrimination based on sexual orientation or gender identity. The bill, however, did not advance any further and died at the end of the legislative term.

The cities of New Orleans, and Shreveport prohibit discrimination in employment, housing and public accommodations on the basis of sexual orientation and gender identity. Alexandria, Baton Rouge, Lafayette and Lake Charles along with the parish of Jefferson prohibit discrimination against public employees only.

Bostock v. Clayton County

On June 15, 2020, the U.S. Supreme Court ruled in Bostock v. Clayton County, consolidated with Altitude Express, Inc. v. Zarda, and R.G. & G.R. Harris Funeral Homes Inc. v. Equal Employment Opportunity Commission that discrimination in the workplace on the basis of sexual orientation or gender identity is discrimination on the basis of sex, and Title VII therefore protects LGBT employees from discrimination.

Hate crime law
Louisiana is one of the few southern states which has a hate crime statute that provides penalty enhancements for crimes motivated by the victim's sexual orientation or perceived sexual orientation. Passed in 1997, after a lobbying effort of five years, its passage made Louisiana the first state in the Deep South to have such a law. The state law does not include gender identity, but hate crimes committed on the basis of the victim's gender identity can be prosecuted through federal courts under the Matthew Shepard and James Byrd Jr. Hate Crimes Prevention Act, which was signed into law in October 2009 by President Barack Obama.

Transgender rights
Transgender people are allowed to change the gender marker on their birth certificate and driver's license in Louisiana. The Office of Motor Vehicles requires applicants to submit a statement signed by a physician confirming that they have undergone successful sex reassignment surgery. The Louisiana Vital Records will issue a new birth certificate upon receipt of a certified copy of a court order confirming surgical gender change; "The court shall require such proof as it deems necessary to be convinced that the petitioner was properly diagnosed as a transsexual or pseudo-hermaphrodite, that sex reassignment or corrective surgery has been properly performed upon the petitioner, and that as a result of such surgery and subsequent medical treatment the anatomical structure of the sex of the petitioner has been changed to a sex other than which is stated on the original birth certificate of the petitioner".

Surgery, puberty blockers, hormone replacement therapy and other transition-related healthcare for transgender people are not covered by health insurance or state Medicaid policies.

Transgender sports ban
In June 2022, Louisiana banned transgender girls from sports in public schools. The bill had more than two-thirds support in both chambers of the Louisiana State Legislature, so the governor, John Bel Edwards, did not try to veto it, as the legislators would have been able to override his veto.

In 2021, a similar bill had passed (House vote 77–17 and Senate vote 29–6), but Governor Edwards vetoed it, calling it a dangerous "big-government overreach and discrimination". The legislature failed by just 2 votes to override his veto.

Domestic violence law
In June 2017, the Louisiana Legislature passed a bill, introduced by Senator Patrick Connick, to remove the words "opposite-sex" from the domestic violence statutes. The bill, which passed 54–42 in the House and 25–13 in the Senate, was signed into law by Governor John Bel Edwards and went into full effect on August 1, 2017. The bill's passage ensures that victims of domestic violence receive identical treatment irrespective of their sexual orientation; previously offenders in same-sex relationships received lesser sentences for domestic violence compared to their heterosexual counterparts. At that time, South Carolina was the only remaining state in the United States to still explicitly include the term "people of the opposite-sex" within its domestic violence laws.

Freedom of expression

No promo homo law
The state of Louisiana maintains a so-called "no promo homo law" law, prohibiting sex education classes from discussing male or female homosexual activity.

National Guard
Following the U.S. Supreme Court decision in United States v. Windsor in June 2013 invalidating Section 3 of the Defense of Marriage Act, the U.S. Department of Defense issued directives requiring state units of the National Guard to enroll the same-sex spouses of guard members in federal benefit programs. Defense Secretary Chuck Hagel on October 31 said he would insist on compliance. On December 3, Louisiana agreed to conform with DoD policy stating that state workers would be considered federal workers while enrolling same-sex couples for benefits.

Public opinion

Recent opinion polls have shown that while Louisianians are mostly evenly split in support and opposition to same-sex marriage, support is increasing and opposition is decreasing.

A 2017 Public Religion Research Institute (PRRI) poll found that 48% of Louisianans supported same-sex marriage, while 44% were opposed and 8% were undecided. Additionally, 61% supported an anti-discrimination law covering sexual orientation and gender identity. 29% were against. The PRRI also found that 54% were against allowing public businesses to refuse to serve LGBT people due to religious beliefs, while 37% supported such religiously-based refusals.

Summary table

See also

 Politics of Louisiana
 LGBT rights in the United States
 Rights and responsibilities of marriages in the United States

References

External links
U.S. District Court decision in Robicheaux v. Caldwell, September 3, 2014

LGBT rights in Louisiana